Pirates of Treasure Island is a 2006 American comedy-drama film produced by The Asylum, loosely adapted from Robert Louis Stevenson's 1883 novel Treasure Island.

The film was criticized as an imitation of the Pirates of the Caribbean film series, particularly as was released just before, and shares several similarities with, Pirates of the Caribbean: Dead Man's Chest.

Plot 
The story opens on Skeleton Island, an uncharted island somewhere in the Falkland Islands chain, where Long John Silver and Billy Bones have staged a successful mutiny against Captain Flint. The group is attacked by gigantic insects, and retreats back to the ship. In the chaos, Long John has one of his legs torn off by a giant beetle.

In the United States in 1782, Jim Hawkins is the owner of the Admiral Benbow Inn, but has grown tired of a life of monotony and seeks adventure. One of his customers, Billy Bones, dies in his inn and leaves Jim a treasure map showing the way to a treasure buried on Skeleton Island.

After gaining the help of Dr. Livesey, Jim and Livesey recruit French mariner Captain Smollete, the captain of the schooner Hispaniola, to sail out to Skeleton Island, under the pretence of going to collect specimens of local wildlife. Jim and Livesey recruit Long John Silver, now using the alias of Barbecue, to act as ship's cook, with Long John providing the rest of the ship's crew.

As the Hispanola makes its way to the island, Hawkins unintentionally discovers Long John's true intentions: to steal the map and to hijack the Hispaniola on behalf of his own band of pirates, whom make up the ship's crew. Long John plans to stage a mutiny upon arriving at Skeleton Island, and to kill the captain, Hawkins and Dr. Livesey so that all of the treasure will belong to the pirates. However, Hawkins is discovered, along with Anne Bonny, who had followed Jim from the inn, and gives him protection from Long John.

On reaching Skeleton Island, the Hispanola is hijacked by Silver, with Smollette, Livesey and an American government official on the voyage kept prisoner on the ship whilst the others go ashore. With the help of marooned mariner Ben Gunn, Jim and Anne Bonney escape, and race to beat Long John and the pirates to the treasure.

Cast 
 Lance Henriksen as Long John Silver
 Tom Nagel as Jim Hawkins
 Rebekah Kochan as Anne Bonney
 Rhett Giles as Wilkins
 Jeff Denton as Dr. Livesey
 James Ferris as Captain Smollete
 Derek Osedach as Jack Falcon
 Justin Jones as Billy Bones
 Chriss Anglin as Captain Flint
 Dean N. Arevalo as Squire Trelawney
 Josh Sobotik as Gray
 Andrea Lui as Yeera "Yee" Wung
 Leigh Scott as Ben Gunn
 Jennifer Lee Wiggins as Polly

Review
The Nerd Signal found Pirates of Treasure Island to be a perfect film for fans of the work of The Asylum Studio.

See also

 30,000 Leagues Under the Sea – Another seafaring film by The Asylum, released in 2007
 Pirates of the Caribbean: Dead Man's Chest – The second film in the Pirates of the Caribbean film series

References

External links 
 Pirates of Treasure Island at The Asylum
 

2000s adventure comedy-drama films
2006 independent films
2006 films
2006 direct-to-video films
Mockbuster films
The Asylum films
2000s English-language films
Films set in 1782
Treasure Island films
Films set in the United States
Films set in the Falkland Islands
American adventure comedy-drama films
Films directed by Leigh Scott
2006 comedy films
2006 drama films
2000s American films